Kangshanagar High School is a combined school in Kangshanagar, Burichang Upazila, Comilla District, Bangladesh. It was established in 1997. The school's Education Institute Identification Number (EIIN) is 105289.

History 
The school was established in 1997. The school was established in 55 sotok area. The official study session was started in 1997.

Facilities

The school has three academic buildings, an administrative building. There is a field in the school area. Other facilities include workshop, auditorium, canteen, and library. There are 13 teachers and 2 staff. The school has two laboratories.

Today

The school conducts a single shift. The uniform is a navy blue shirt, blue long trousers, black belt and white shoes. The school monogram is printed on the shirt pocket. Usually students are admitted in class 6. Admission can be considered in other classes if a vacancy is available or if someone is transferred from some other government school. The admission test is usually taken in the first week of January.

Academic performance
The JSC and SSC examinations are conducted by the Board of Secondary and Intermediate Education under the Ministry of Education. Junior School Certificate (JSC) is a public examination taken by students in Bangladesh after successful completion of eight years of schooling  and Secondary School Certificate (SSC) is the diploma awarded for the completion of grade ten, which is equivalent to the O Levels in the UK. The JSC examination consists of nine subjects totaling 900 marks, with each subject given 100 marks and the SSC examination consists of eleven subjects totaling 1,100 marks, with each subject given 100 marks, including practical tests for science subjects. A minimum of 33 marks are required to pass each subject. Subjects will depend on which major program a student has elected to study. These major programs are Sciences; Arts and Humanities; and Business Studies. Students have to elect one of these three programs just before enrollment in the 9th grade for SSC. Results of both the exams are published in the form of a GPA. The highest score is GPA-5. The Comilla Education Board annually ranks schools and colleges from across the region in terms of GPA-5 scorers. The school was awarded as "Best School in Chittagong Division" in 2004 and "Best School" in 2010 by BSB Foundation for good result both in SSC & JSC.

Extracurricular activities 
 BNCC (Bangladesh National Cadet Core)
 Scouting
 Games and sports (mostly athletics, cricket, badminton and football)
 Debating
 Math and language competitions.
 Picnic
 Social Development

See also
 Education in Bangladesh
 List of universities and schools in Comilla
 List of schools in Bangladesh

References
 http://comillaboard.gov.bd/index.php/institute-list

High schools in Bangladesh
1997 establishments in Bangladesh
Educational institutions established in 1997
Schools in Comilla District